Tekkeh (also Romanized as Tekeh and Tokeh) is a village in Shaban Rural District, in the Central District of Nahavand County, Hamadan Province, Iran. At the 2006 census, its population was 674, in 175 families.

References 

Populated places in Nahavand County